Lynette Vaynor Davies (18 October 1948 – 1 December 1993) was a Welsh stage, television, and film actress.

Life
The daughter of a Customs and Excise officer, Davies was born in Tonypandy, Glamorgan, in 1948, and was educated at Our Lady's School, Cardiff. She trained for an acting career at the Royal Academy of Dramatic Art in London before going into repertory at the Bristol Old Vic.
 
In 1974 she appeared as Regan in a Royal Shakespeare Company production of King Lear, and later the same year she played Yulia in the RSC's first British production of Maxim Gorky's Summerfolk at the Aldwych Theatre. 
 
Her highest-profile role was as Davinia Prince, the central character in The Foundation, a British television series of 1977–1978 by ATV about the widow of a business tycoon.

In 1989 she played Doll Tearsheet in an English Shakespeare Company production of Henry IV, Part 2.

In December 1993, at the age of forty-five, Davies drowned at Lavernock Point, on the coast of the Vale of Glamorgan. The cause of death was later determined as suicide.

At the time of her death Davies was living at 31a Mortimer Road, Cardiff CF11, and she left an estate valued at £251,073.

Screen roles
Clayhanger (1976) – Adela Orgreave 
The Ghosts of Motley Hall (1976) – Miss Uproar/Imogen 
Raffles (1977) – Lady Camilla Belsize 
Will Shakespeare (1978) – Countess of Southampton
The Foundation (1977-1978) – Davinia Prince
Tales of the Unexpected, "The Last Bottle in the World" (1981) – Sophie Kassoulas
Miracles Take Longer (1984) – Jenny Swanne 
Tales of the Unexpected, "The Best Chess Player in the World" (1984) – Paula Shaw
No Place Like Home, "Dear Miss Davenport" (1986) – Celia Davenport 
Inside Story (1986) – Eileen Stead
The District Nurse (1987) – Isobel Huxtable 
Bergerac, "Treasure Hunt" (1987) – Miranda Bassett
The Watch House (1988) – Fiona
The Christmas Stallion (1992) – Nerys
Street Legal, "Children's Hour" (1992) – Dr Renata Berger

Notes

1948 births
1993 deaths
Alumni of RADA
Welsh film actresses
Welsh stage actresses
Welsh television actresses
Suicides in Wales
People from Tonypandy
20th-century Welsh actresses
1993 suicides
Suicides by drowning in the United Kingdom